Tractatus politicus (TP) or Political Treatise was the last treatise written by Baruch Spinoza. It was written in 1675–76 and published posthumously in 1677. This paper has the subtitle, "In quo demonstratur, quomodo Societas, ubi Imperium Monarchicum locum habet, sicut et ea, ubi Optimi imperant, debet institui, ne in Tyrannidem labatur, et ut Pax, Libertasque civium inviolata maneat." ("In which it is demonstrated how a society, may it be a monarchy or an aristocracy, can be best governed, and not fall into tyranny, and how the peace and liberty of the citizens must not be violated").

Summary
The Political Treatise has eleven Chapters: I. Introduction, II. Of Natural law (referring to his Theologico-Political Treatise), III. Of the Right of Supreme Authorities, IV. Of the Function of Supreme Authorities, V. Of best State of Dominion, VI. to VII. Of Monarchy, VIII. to X. Of Aristocracy, XI. Of Democracy.  
 
As in Aristotle's Politics, Spinoza analyzes each form of government: monarchy, aristocracy, and democracy without affirming which of these is the best. Unlike Aristotle, Spinoza argued in the last chapter that democracy is not "rule of majority", but freedom for all by the natural law. Although he affirms that women are not equal to men in ability, and addresses the danger of Amazons, he suggests the commonwealth could possibly be governed by both sexes.

The treatise also characterises the notion of peace in Chapter V, section 4, affirming that "Peace is not mere absence of war, but is a virtue that springs from force of character." In the same Chapter, section 7 Niccolò Machiavelli is referred to as stating that the prince should establish and maintain dominion, though why Machiavelli did this is not clear, with the suggestion that Machiavelli is showing how imprudent it is to try to remove a tyrant if one is unable to remove the causes of his being a tyrant. Indeed, it has been suggested that the Political Treatise is an extended response to the authoritarian rule of William of Orange following the invasion of the Netherlands by France in 1672 and which continued as Spinoza was writing the text.

See also 
Theologico-Political Treatise
Natural law
Form of government

References

External links
 
 

Political philosophy
Works by Baruch Spinoza
Treatises